Bak kut teh (also spelt bah kut teh and abbreviated BKT; , Teochew Pe̍h-uē-jī: nêg8-gug4-dê5) is a pork rib dish cooked in broth popularly served in Malaysia and Singapore where there is a predominant Hoklo and Teochew community.

The name literally translates from the Hokkien dialect as "meat bone tea", and at its simplest, consists of pork ribs simmered in a broth of herbs and spices (including star anise, cinnamon, cloves, dong quai, fennel seeds and garlic) for hours. Despite its name, there is in fact no tea in the dish itself; the name refers to a strong oolong Chinese tea which is usually served alongside the soup in the belief that it dilutes or dissolves the copious amount of fat consumed in this pork-laden dish.

However, additional ingredients may include offal, varieties of mushroom, choy sum, and pieces of dried tofu or fried tofu puffs.  Additional Chinese herbs may include yu zhu (玉竹, rhizome of Solomon's seal) and ju zhi (buckthorn fruit), which give the soup a sweeter, slightly stronger flavor. Light and dark soy sauce are also added to the soup during cooking, with varying amounts depending on the variant – the Teochew's version is lighter than the Hokkiens'. The dish can be garnished with chopped coriander or green onions and a sprinkling of fried shallots.

In Malaysia, it is often served with strips of fried dough called you char kway. Soy sauce (usually dark soy sauce, but light soy sauce is also offered sometimes) is preferred as a condiment, with which chopped chilli padi (Bird's eyes chili) and minced garlic is taken together. Tea of various kinds, for example the Tieguanyin variety which is popular in the Klang Valley area of Malaysia, is also usually served in the belief that it dilutes or dissolves the copious amount of fat consumed in this pork-laden dish.

In Singapore, similarly the Teochew variant dish is served with a side of youtiao cut into small pieces, meant to be dipped into the soup of the dish before consumption. Braised pig trotters are also an option that can be ordered as a side together with the dish and dark soy sauce with chilli padi is preferred as a condiment. Tea, prepared in a kung fu tea ceremony is also served in restaurants specialising in the dish.

Bak kut teh is usually eaten for breakfast  or lunch. The Hokkien and Teochew are traditionally tea-drinking cultures and this aspect runs deep in their cuisines.

History

Bak kut teh is commonly consumed in both Malaysia and Singapore. The origin of bak kut teh is unclear, but it is believed to have been brought over from Fujian, China and to have derived from the Fujianese dish known as niu pai. In Malaysia, the dish is popularly associated with Klang, where the locals believe it to be the place of origin of bak kut teh. There are a number of claims for the invention of the dish; one claimed that a local sinseh (a Chinese physician) invented the dish in the 1930s, while another claimed he brought the recipe from his hometown in Fujian, China, in the 1940s.  The dish is also claimed to have been invented in Port Klang for coolies working at the port to supplement their meagre diet and as a tonic to boost their health in the early 20th century. The dish was popular among early Chinese immigrants, many of whom had also come from Fujian.

The Teochew variant was developed in Singapore and was sold along areas located beside the Singapore River, specifically in Clarke Quay and River Valley after the end of World War II. By the 1960s, bak kut teh had become a popular street fare in Singapore. Certain business has been focused mainly on serving this dish, and developed their business from humble pushcart into a restaurant chain.

The Chinese word bak, which means "meat" (or more specifically pork), is the vernacular pronunciation in Hokkien, but not in Teochew (which pronounced it as nek), suggesting an original Hokkien root.

The question of its origin has been the subject of a dispute between Malaysia and Singapore; in 2009, the tourism minister of Malaysia, Ng Yen Yen, claimed that bak kut teh is a dish of Malaysian origin, and that neighbouring countries had "hijacked" many of Malaysia's original dishes.

Varieties

There are numerous variants of bak kut teh with its cooking style closely influenced by the prevailing Chinese enclave of a certain geographical location.

There are three main types of bak kut teh.
 The Teochew style, which is light in colour but uses more pepper and garlic in the soup.
 The Hoklo (Hokkien), uses a variety of herbs and soy sauce creating a more fragrant, textured and darker soup. 
 The Cantonese, with a soup-drinking culture, add medicinal herbs as well to create a stronger flavoured soup.

The main visual difference between the Hokkien and Teochew version of bak kut teh is that the Hokkiens use more dark soy sauce and thus the soup base is characteristically darker in colour.

In addition, a dry form of bak kut teh has also recently become increasingly popular within Malaysia, especially in Klang town. Although called dry, the broth is in fact reduced to a thicker gravy, to which other ingredients such as wolfberries, dried dates, dried chillies and dried squid are added. Unlike the original rib soup, the dry version has a tangier, sharper taste and is more akin to a herbal stew than the classical broth. It is often recommended locally in Malaysia as an excellent hangover cure.

In Malaysia, a less fatty variation of bak kut teh made with chicken instead of pork is called chik kut teh. It also serves as a halal version of the dish catered to Muslims, whose religion forbids them to consume pork.

Bak kut  is popular among the Chinese Indonesian community in the Riau Islands, Indonesia.

Vegetarian bak kut  also can be found in Malaysia. Instead of using pork or chicken, oyster mushroom is used.

Malaysian national record
On 22 November 2008, the Malaysian Klang Chinese Chamber of Commerce and Industry (KCCCI) collaborated with five bak kut teh sellers in Klang to cook the world's biggest bowl of the Hokkien variant of bak kut teh. The bowl was 182.88 cm in diameter and 91.44 cm in height, and contained 500 kg of pork, 450 kg of soup and 50 kg of herbal medicine, and has been listed in the Malaysian Book of Record.

See also

 Sekba
 List of Chinese soups
 List of soups

References

External links

Chinese soups
Teochew cuisine
Fujian cuisine
Indonesian cuisine
Malaysian cuisine
Singaporean cuisine
Chinese pork dishes